The 1989 NAIA Division II football season, as part of the 1989 college football season in the United States and the 34th season of college football sponsored by the NAIA, was the 20th season of play of the NAIA's lower division for football.

The season was played from August to November 1989 and culminated in the 1989 NAIA Division II Football National Championship, played at a neutral field in Canton, Ohio.

In rematch of the previous year's final, Westminster (PA) repeated as national champion by defeating Wisconsin–La Crosse, 51–30, to win their fifth NAIA national title.

Conference changes
 This is the final season that the NAIA officially recognizes football champions from the Illini–Badger Football Conference and the Wisconsin State University Conference. Both conferences would eventually join NCAA Division III; the IBFC would continue to sponsor football until 2007 while the WSUC, which would evolve into the Wisconsin Intercollegiate Athletic Conference in 1997, continues to sponsor the sport.

Conference standings

Conference champions

Postseason

‡ ''Game played at Puyallup, Washington

See also
 1989 NCAA Division I-A football season
 1989 NCAA Division I-AA football season
 1989 NCAA Division II football season
 1989 NCAA Division III football season

References

 
NAIA Football National Championship